Jan Larsen is a retired Danish professional darts player.

Darts career
Larsen is a 2-time Danish Champion, who has been picked 12 times for the national team 

He was the first Dane to represent Denmark at the BDO World darts Championships  - in 1981 he played Luc Marreel and lost narrowly 2-1.

During the late 1970s and early 1980s, Larsen was a dominating figure in Danish and Scandinavian darts, winning a total of 9 Danish Championships,  and 3 Nordic Championships (single, pairs and team events)

World Championship results

BDO
1982: 2nd Round (lost to Luc Marreel 1-2) (sets)

References

External links
 Jan Larsen stats at the Darts Database

Danish darts players
Living people
British Darts Organisation players
Year of birth missing (living people)